David Thompson Secondary School may refer to:

David Thompson Secondary School (Vancouver), British Columbia, Canada
David Thompson Secondary School (Invermere), British Columbia, Canada